Villa Gesell Airport  is an airport serving Villa Gesell, an Atlantic coastal town in the Buenos Aires Province of Argentina.

Runway length includes a  displaced threshold on Runway 11.

The Villa Gesell non-directional beacon (Ident: GES) is located on the field.

See also

Transport in Argentina
List of airports in Argentina

References

External links
OpenStreetMap - Villa Gesell Airport
SkyVector - Villa Gesell Airport

Airports in Argentina